Francis Black may refer to:

Francis Black (1870–1941), politician in Manitoba, Canada
Francis Marion Black (1836–1902), Justice of the Missouri Supreme Court

See also
Black Francis, American singer, songwriter and guitarist
Frank Black (disambiguation)
Frances Black (born 1960), Irish singer